Western scrub jay has been split into the following species:
 California scrub jay,	Aphelocoma californica
 Woodhouse's scrub jay, 	Aphelocoma woodhouseii
The island scrub jay, A. insularis, is a scrub jay and lives in the West, but was not part of the western scrub jay species.

Birds by common name